Brian Chad Johnson (born August 11, 1987) is an American reality television personality. He was a contestant on The Bachelorette, Bachelor in Paradise, Famously Single and Celebrity Big Brother UK, and also appeared in the second season of MTV's Ex on the Beach. In his appearance on The Bachelorette, Johnson was regarded as meeting the archetype of a reality television "villain".

Johnson was arrested in February 2020 for robbery with domestic violence enhancement charges involving his girlfriend. The arrest resulted in the cancellation of most of his TV appearances. He subsequently announced that he was starting a career in pornography. In August 2020, Johnson reached a deal with prosecutors in which he pleaded "no contest" to one count of vandalism and one count of intimidating a witness. He was sentenced to 36 months probation and domestic violence classes.

Early life
Chad Johnson was born on August 11, 1987, in Jenks, Oklahoma. He graduated from Jenks High School in 2005 and later graduated from the University of Oklahoma.

Television career

The Bachelor franchise
In 2016, Johnson became a contestant on the ABC Network reality television show The Bachelorette season 12 to compete for Joelle "JoJo" Fletcher's affections. As the season's "villain", he was nicknamed "Bad Chad".

In the summer of 2016, Johnson joined The Bachelor spin-off show, Bachelor in Paradise. The show follows former Bachelor and Bachelorette contestants living together and finding love in Mexico. He was ejected by host Chris Harrison during the first episode for belligerent behavior.

Famously Single
In 2017, Johnson was cast as a member of season 2 of the E! network reality television show Famously Single. The series follows eight single celebrities who move in together and try to solve their romantic problems. Alongside Johnson starred I Love New York's Tiffany Pollard, Jersey Shore's Ronnie Ortiz-Magro, Keeping Up with the Kardashians's Malika Haqq, Dancing with the Stars's Karina Smirnoff, and Rich Kids of Beverly Hills'''s Dorothy Wang.

Celebrity Big Brother
Johnson appeared on Celebrity Big Brother 20''. He reached the finale and ultimately finished in 5th place, behind Derek Acorah, Sam Thompson, Amelia Lily and Sarah Harding.

2020 arrest and pornographic career
On the afternoon of February 24, 2020, Johnson was arrested for robbery with domestic violence enhancement charges. The arrest stemmed from an incident with his girlfriend Annalise Mishler, who alleged that Johnson had assaulted her. When officers arrived, they found visible red marks on Mishler's face. Mishler also alleged that Johnson had punched a hole in a wall. Johnson was charged with one count of assault and battery, one count of corporal injury, one count of witness intimidation, one count of trespassing, and two counts of vandalism.

After the arrest, most of Johnson's previously booked TV appearances were canceled and Johnson claimed to be beginning a career in pornography. In August of 2020, Johnson struck a plea deal with prosecutors in which he pleaded "no contest" to one count of vandalism and one count of intimidating a witness. He was sentenced to 36 months probation, domestic violence classes, and faced a restitution hearing to be held a few months later. Four other charges of corporal injury, battery, trespassing, and vandalism were dropped as part of the deal.

Sunset Studios lawsuit
In July 2018, Johnson filed a lawsuit against Sunset Studios Entertainment LLC and Cristina Cimino, an executive for that company. The lawsuit accused the defendants of sexual harassment, failure to prevent harassment, intentional infliction of emotional distress and fraud by intentional misrepresentation. In July 2020, a Los Angeles Superior Court judge ruled that Johnson had proven multiple causes of action against the defendants.

No attorneys for Cimino or Sunset Studios participated in the hearing; the company itself has been defunct since 2019.

Filmography

References

External links
 Official website

1987 births
Living people
Big Brother (British TV series) contestants
Celebrity Big Brother
People from Jenks, Oklahoma
University of Oklahoma alumni
Bachelor Nation contestants